Olympiacos Women's Basketball is the women's basketball department of the major Greek multi-sport club Olympiacos CFP, based in Piraeus. The department was initially founded in 1947, being one of the best women's basketball clubs in Greece during the 1950s and the early 1960s, when they won 3 Women's Division Center Championships (1956, 1958, 1959), which was the most important competition of Greek women's basketball at the time (until 1967–68 when the Greek Women's Basketball League was officially organized). The department was dissolved in the mid-1960s and after a long period of inactivity, it was reorganized in 2015.

In 2015–16 season, which was the first after its reorganization, Olympiacos won the double undefeated; they won the Greek League with 22 wins in 22 matches, sweeping arch-rivals Panathinaikos with 4–0 wins in the finals and also clinched the Greek Cup title, beating Panathinaikos once again in the final (63–60). They managed to repeat this achievement in 2016–17, 2017–18 and 2018–19 seasons, thus winning a record four consecutive undefeated Doubles with a record 113 straight wins in both the Greek Championship and the Greek Cup.

Roster

Depth chart

Gallery

Honours

Domestic competitions
 Greek League
 Winners (6): 2015–16, 2016–17, 2017–18, 2018–19, 2019–20, 2021–22
 Greek Cup
 Winners (5) (record): 2015–16, 2016–17, 2017–18, 2018–19, 2021–22
 Double
 Winners (5) (record): 2015–16, 2016–17, 2017–18, 2018–19, 2021–22

Regional competitions
 Women's Division Center Championship
 Winners (3): 1956, 1958, 1959

Technical and managerial staff

Seasons

Notable players

Notable coaches

Kit manufacturers and Shirt sponsors

See also
 Olympiacos Men's Basketball

References

External links

 Olympiacos CFP official website – Women's Basketball 
 Olympiacos Women's Basketball – Eurobasket.com

 
Basketball
Basketball teams established in 1947
Women's basketball teams in Greece
Basketball teams in Piraeus